South African women were scheduled to tour Bangladesh in the second half of October. The tour consisted of three ODIs and five T20Is. On 5 October 2015, ten days prior to the supposed team's arrival in Bangladesh and four days after the men's Australian tour of Bangladesh was postponed, CSA decided to postpone the tour on grounds of security. On 15 October, a new schedule for the tour was sent by BCB to CSA and BCB announced the tour will take place in November consisting of three ODIs and four T20Is. However, on 2 November, one day before the team's new scheduled arrival in Bangladesh, it was reported the team would not arrive. A day later (3 November), CSA confirmed it was postponing the series over "personal security concerns".

As of 16 November (scheduled day of the last match from the tour) none of the matches has taken place. There has been no official statement from neither BCB nor CSA about new dates or rescheduling of the series.

WODI series

1st WODI

2nd WODI

3rd WODI

WT20I series

1st WT20I

2nd WT20I

3rd WT20I

4th WT20I

References

External links
 Tour page - Cricinfo

2015 in Bangladeshi cricket
2015 in South African cricket
South African cricket tours of Bangladesh
International cricket competitions in 2015–16
Bangladeshi cricket seasons from 2000–01
South 2015
Bang
cricket
2015 in Bangladeshi women's sport